Men's 100m races for wheelchair athletes at the 2004 Summer Paralympics were held in the Athens Olympic Stadium. Events were held in two disability classes.

T52

The T52 event consisted of 2 heats and a final. It was won by Thomas Geierspichler, representing .

1st Round

Heat 1
22 Sept. 2004, 09:10

Heat 2
22 Sept. 2004, 09:22

Final Round
23 Sept. 2004, 19:50

T54

The T54 event consisted of 3 heats, 2 semifinals and a final. It was won by Saúl Mendoza, representing .

1st Round

Heat 1
19 Sept. 2004, 18:15

Heat 2
19 Sept. 2004, 18:24

Heat 3
19 Sept. 2004, 18:33

Semifinals
Heat 1
20 Sept. 2004, 19:10

Heat 2
20 Sept. 2004, 19:25

Final Round
21 Sept. 2004, 09:05

References

M